Noah Bennett is a fictional character on the NBC/DirecTV soap opera Passions, portrayed by Dylan Fergus from May 13, 2005, to August 7, 2008.

Storylines
Noah had a happy childhood as the eldest child (and only son) of Sam and Grace Bennett. Noah grew up close to both of his parents, as well as his two younger sisters, Kay and Jessica. By the time the show began in 1999, Noah was already off at college and was preparing to begin his second year. He came home to visit around Christmas of 1999, though he was never seen on-air.

In 2005, Sam discovered that Noah, whom he had believed was in graduate school at King's Standish University, had dropped out nearly two years prior. In reality, Noah had been making his way through life by gambling, squatting in hotels, and other activities not exactly befitting to the son of the chief of police.

Noah, going by the name Ned, met Fancy Crane at a hotel in Las Vegas where they barely survived the thugs they had crossed while staying there. Both returned to Harmony and eventually fell in love. Noah and Fancy's relationship was strained when Lena blackmailed Noah into pretending Maya Chinn, his former lover, was still his girlfriend or she would go after the people he loved. Alistair Crane, Fancy's grandfather, had arranged all of this to ensure his beloved granddaughter Fancy would break up with Noah.

After the breakup, it was implied that Noah was sleeping with several women, but was not serious with any of them, before he became seriously involved with Paloma Lopez-Fitzgerald, who recently accepted his marriage proposal. The two were set to marry in a double wedding with Luis Lopez-Fitzgerald and Fancy in prison (prior to Luis's execution), but Fancy's sister Pretty Crane threw a wrench in the works, causing Fancy to call a halt to the ceremony. Noah finally married Paloma in the July 29, 2008 episode in front of friends and family. On the series finale, Paloma told Noah that she was pregnant, and the two looked forward to starting a family.

Hidden Passions
In the book Hidden Passions, Noah's maternal grandparents were Zachary Sutter and Mercy Standish. His paternal grandparents were named Benjamin Bennett (on the show it was Sam) and Margaret Joyce. He also had at least two more uncles in addition to Hank. Information in the book has not been confirmed on-screen and is not considered to be official since the information seen on the show contradicts much of what was said in the book.

See also
Bennett and Standish families
Lopez-Fitzgerald family

References

External links
Who's who in Harmony: Noah Bennett at Soapcentral.com
PASSIONS CAST - NOAH BENNETT at Soaps.com
Noah Bennett at NBC

Passions characters
Television characters introduced in 2005
Fictional bartenders
Fictional paramedics
Male characters in television